Alex Doyle (29 July 1904 – 21 January 1973) was an Australian rules footballer who played for the Carlton Football Club in the Victorian Football League (VFL).

Notes

External links 

Alex Doyle's profile at Blueseum

1904 births
1973 deaths
Carlton Football Club players
Horsham Football Club players
Australian rules footballers from Victoria (Australia)